The 1994–95 FIBA European League, also shortened to 1994–95 FIBA EuroLeague, was the 38th installment of the European top-tier level professional club competition for basketball clubs (now called EuroLeague). It began on September 8, 1994, and ended on April 13, 1995. The competition's Final Four was held at Zaragoza.

Competition system
40 teams (the cup title holder, national domestic league champions, and a variable number of other clubs from the most important national domestic leagues) played knock-out rounds on a home and away basis. The aggregate score of both games decided the winner. 
The sixteen remaining teams after the knock-out rounds entered the Regular Season Group Stage, divided into two groups of eight teams, playing a round-robin. The final standing was based on individual wins and defeats. In the case of a tie between two or more teams after the group stage, the following criteria were used to decide the final classification: 1) number of wins in one-to-one games between the teams; 2) basket average between the teams; 3) general basket average within the group.
The top four teams from each group after the Regular Season Group Stage qualified for a Quarterfinal Playoff (X-pairings, best of 3 games).
The four winners of the Quarterfinal Playoff qualified for the Final Stage (Final Four), which was played at a predetermined venue.

First round

|}

*Levski Sofia withdrew before the first leg and Pezoporikos Larnaca received a forfeit (20-0) in both games.

Second round

|}

Automatically qualified to the group stage
 Olympiacos
 Real Madrid Teka

Group stage
If one or more clubs are level on won-lost record, tiebreakers are applied in the following order:
Head-to-head record in matches between the tied clubs
Overall point difference in games between the tied clubs
Overall point difference in all group matches (first tiebreaker if tied clubs are not in the same group)
Points scored in all group matches
Sum of quotients of points scored and points allowed in each group match

Quarterfinals
The seed teams played games 2 and 3 at home.

|}

Final four

Semifinals
April 11, Pabellón Príncipe Felipe, Zaragoza

|}

3rd place game
April 13, Pabellón Príncipe Felipe, Zaragoza

|}

Final
April 13, Pabellón Príncipe Felipe, Zaragoza

|}

Final standings

Awards

FIBA European League Top Scorer
 Saša Danilović ( Buckler Bologna)

FIBA European League Final Four MVP
 Arvydas Sabonis ( Real Madrid Teka)

FIBA European League Finals Top Scorer
 Arvydas Sabonis ( Real Madrid Teka)

FIBA European League All-Final Four Team

References

External links
1994–95 FIBA European League
1994–95 FIBA European League

FIBA
1994-1995